Anikeyevsky is a rural locality (a village) in Bayguzinsky Selsoviet, Ishimbaysky District, Bashkortostan, Russia. The population was 12 as of 2010. There is 1 street.

Geography 
Anikeyevsky is located 25 km east of Ishimbay (the district's administrative centre) by road. Kashalakbash is the nearest rural locality.

References 

Rural localities in Ishimbaysky District